George Somers Clarke (1841–1926) was an architect and English Egyptologist who worked on the restoration and design of churches and at a number of sites throughout Egypt, notably in El Kab, where he built a house. He was born in Brighton.

As an architect he entered the offices of Sir Gilbert Scott and later worked in partnership with John Thomas Micklethwaite from offices at 15 Dean's Yard, Westminster, London. He was Surveyor of the Fabric of St Paul's Cathedral from 1897 to 1906.

After his retirement Clarke continued to live in Egypt and died in Mahamid in August 1926.

Works
1965 Mountains, Hildenborough, Kent
1872–78 Wyfold Court, Rotherfield Peppard, Oxfordshire
1874–75 St Martin's parish church, Lewes Road, Brighton (Wagner Memorial Church), the largest church in Brighton, complete except proposed saddle-back tower. Spectacular pulpit based on the Sacrament House in St. Lorenz, Nuremberg.
1875 scheme for remodelling and extending St Peter's Church, Brighton (only partly achieved)
1879 St Nicholas parish church, Kiddington, Oxfordshire: vestry and organ loft
1885 Parish church of St John The Divine, Gainsborough, Lincolnshire
1885 Church at Wimbledon (proposed)
1889 St Mary's Church, Potton, Bedfordshire
1890 St Peter's parish church, Marsh Baldon, Oxfordshire: restoration (with Micklethwaite)
1891 Reid's Palace Hotel, Funchal, Madeira
1892 St Saviour's parish church, Folkestone, Kent
1892 designs for wall paintings by C.E. Kempe in St Nicholas' Church, Brighton
1893 The Frank James Memorial Hospital, East Cowes, Isle of Wight.
1900–06 (with Micklethwaite) St Peter's parish church, Brighton: new chancel with eleven-light east window
1910 Chichester Cathedral: reredos
SS Philip & James parish church, Oxford: reredos

References

Sources

External links
 

1841 births
1926 deaths
Architects from Brighton
19th-century English architects
English Egyptologists
20th-century English architects
19th-century archaeologists
20th-century archaeologists